The Girl on a Motorcycle (French: La motocyclette) is a 1968 British-French erotic romantic drama film directed by Jack Cardiff, starring Alain Delon and Marianne Faithfull and featuring Roger Mutton, Marius Goring and Catherine Jourdan. It was listed to compete at the 1968 Cannes Film Festival but the festival was cancelled due to the May 1968 events in France. The Girl on a Motorcycle redefined the leather jacket for motorcyclists into a catsuit that Faithfull wore in the film. It was the first film to receive an X rating in the United States.  Edited by Warner Brothers to get an "R" rating, the film was released as Naked Under Leather in the United States.

Plot
The film is set in France and Germany.

Newly married Rebecca leaves her husband Raymond's bed on her prized motorbike—her symbol of freedom and escape.  During her ride to visit Daniel, her lover in Heidelberg, she indulges in psychedelic and erotic reveries as she relives her changing relationship with the two men.  Her flashback scenes reveal the background story.   Rebecca met Daniel while working at her father's bookshop a few weeks before her marriage to Raymond, a school teacher.  Daniel gives Rebecca motorcycle driving lessons on a Norton motorcycle.  They quickly become lovers. She asks him if he will marry her, and he simply says "No". She tells him that she is soon to be married, and he says he will give her a wedding present. A Harley Davidson Electra Glide motorcycle is delivered to Rebecca at the bookshop. Her father says she should refuse it, but she asks Raymond what she should do and he says she should do what will make her happy. She rides the motorcycle from France to Germany to be with Daniel. After having several drinks of kirsch in a small village bar, she drives fast and recklessly, and although she wears leathers she has no helmet. Her ride to Daniel ends prematurely when she collides with a truck which swerves in front of her, throwing her head-first through the windscreen of an oncoming car, which then crashes into the truck.

Cast
 Alain Delon as Daniel
 Marianne Faithfull as Rebecca
 Roger Mutton as Raymond
 Marius Goring as Rebecca's Father
 Catherine Jourdan as Catherine
 Jean Leduc as Jean
 Jacques Marin as Pump Attendant
 André Maranne as French Superintendent
 Bari Jonson as First French Customs Officer
 Arnold Diamond as Second French Customs Officer
 John G. Heller as German Customs Officer
 Marika Rivera as German Waitress
 Richard Blake as 1st Student
 Chris Williams as 2nd Student
 Colin West as 3rd Student

Cast notes
Faithfull's riding double in medium to distant shots was Bill Ivy, British GP champion and former world champion motorcyclist.

Production
The film was made on locations in France (including Haguenau), Germany (including Neulauterburg), Switzerland (including Geneva), and Belgium.  The bookshop scenes were filmed at a bookshop in Geneva.  In many of the scenes where Marianne Faithfull is seen driving the Harley Davidson Electra Glide motorcycle at high speeds, she was seated on the motorcycle which was attached to a platform that was being pulled by a vehicle in front of it.  Many of the scenes were filmed in the English language and then again in the French language.  Cardiff received extensive cooperation from the police in blocking the roads, so many scenes show only the lone motorcycle and no other vehicular traffic. The final crash scene was staged on an abandoned airstrip in England. The "psychedelic" colour effects were achieved by solarizing the film during post-production.

Reception
The film was the sixth most popular movie in general release in Britain during 1968.

Home media releases
The Girl on a Motorcycle was released on VHS in 1998 and DVD in 1999 by Starz/Anchor Bay. A remastered edition on DVD and Blu-ray Disc was released in 2012 by Jezebel.  Both versions contain the same film material, commentary by director Jack Cardiff, and original theatrical trailer.  However, the earlier version is approximately 91 minutes long, while the later, remastered version, is approximately 88 minutes long.  This time discrepancy is due to the earlier version playing at a slightly slower speed.

References

External links
 
 

1968 films
1960s romance films
1960s English-language films
British romance films
French romance films
Adultery in films
Motorcycling films
Films based on short fiction
Films set in Heidelberg
Films set in West Germany
Films directed by Jack Cardiff
English-language French films
1960s British films
1960s French films